(before 2006 known as the ) is a Japanese keiretsu (association of businesses) centered on companies established by railway tycoon Ichizō Kobayashi: Hankyu Hanshin Holdings, H2O Retailing and Toho. The keiretsu historically included Sanwa Bank, now part of Mitsubishi UFJ Financial Group, and is still closely linked to MUFG; it also has close ties with the Fujisankei Communications Group.

Ownership structures

Group companies
(note: list incomplete)

Hankyu Hanshin Holdings Group
Hankyu Hanshin Holdings, Inc. (January 15, 1906 - May 31, 1907: Mino-o Arima Railway Company, June 1, 1907 - February 3, 1918: Mino-o Arima Tramway Company, February 4, 1918 - September 30, 1943: Hanshin Kyuko Railway Company, October 1, 1943 - March 30, 1973: Keihanshin Kyuko Railway Company, April 1, 1973 - September 30, 2005: Hankyu Corporation, October 1, 2005 - September 30, 2006: Hankyu Holdings, Inc.)
Hankyu Corporation (December 7, 1989 - March 28, 2004: Act Systems, March 29, 2004 - September 30, 2005: A prepared company to separate Hankyu Corporation)
Takarazuka Revue
Hankyu Hotel Management Co., Ltd.
Hankyu Hanshin Hotels Co., Ltd.
Hanshin Electric Railway Co., Ltd. (June 12, 1899 - July 6, 1899: Settsu Electric Railway Co., Ltd.)
Toho Company, Ltd.
Tokyo Rakutenchi Comopany, Limited
Hankyu Airlines Co., Ltd.
Takarazuka Stage Co., Ltd.
Takarazuka Eizo Co., Ltd. (Takarazuka Eiga)
Hankyu Bus Co., Ltd.
Hankyu Denen Bus Co., Ltd.
Hankyu Sightseeing Bus Co., Ltd.
Hankyu Facilities Co., Ltd.
Hankyu Realty Co., Ltd.
Hankyu Taxi, Inc.
Hankyu Hanshin Express Co., Ltd.
Hanshin Bus Co., Ltd.
Hanshin Tigers Co., Ltd.
Hanshin Contents Link, Corp.
Billboard JAPAN (with Prometheus Global Media)
Hanshin Engineering Co., Ltd.
Hanshin Kensetsu Co., Ltd.
Hanshin Station Net Co., Ltd.
Hanshin Taxi Co., Ltd.
Hanshin Laisure Facilities Co., Ltd.
Hanshin Real Estate Co., Ltd.
Osaka Hanshin Taxi Co., Ltd.
Hankyu Hanshin Card Co., Ltd.
Umeda Arts Theater Co., Ltd.
Umeda Center Building
FM KITA
OS Co., Ltd.
Osaka Shintetsu Toyonaka Taxi, Inc.
Hokushin Kyuko Railway Co., Ltd.
Kansai Telecasting Corporation
Kita-Osaka Kyuko Railway Co., Ltd.
Kobe Electric Railway Co., Ltd.
Kobe Rapid Transit Railway Co., Ltd.
Mori-Gumi Co., Ltd.
Nose Electric Railway Co., Ltd.
Osaka Airport Transport Co., Ltd.

H2O Retailing Group
H2O Retailing Corporation (- September 30, 2007: Hankyu Department Stores, Inc.)
Hankyu Hanshin Department Stores, Inc. (October 1, 2007 - September 30, 2008: Hankyu Department Stores, Inc., now owns Hankyu Department Store and Hanshin Department Store)
Hanshoku Co., Ltd.
Persona Co., Ltd.

Toho Group
Toho Company, Ltd.
Tokyo Rakutenchi Comopany, Limited
Nippon Eiga Shinsha Co.
TOHO-TOWA Co., Ltd.
International Television Films, Inc.
Toho Cinemas, Ltd.
OS Co., Ltd.
TOHO Dance Hall, Ltd.

External links
Hankyu Hanshin Toho Group 

Keiretsu
Hankyu Railway
Hanshin Electric Railway
Conglomerate companies of Japan
Hankyu Hanshin Holdings